Sid Ahmed Ferroukhi (11 July 1967 – 17 June 2022) was an Algerian politician.

Biography
Sid Ahmed was the son of doctor Hamdane Ferroukhi and the nephew of resistance fighter . He obtained the title of state engineer in agronomy from the Higher National Agronomic School, of which he became Deputy Director in 1997. In 2005, he was appointed Secretary-General of the Algerian Space Agency.

Ferroukhi served as Minister of Fisheries and Fishery Resources from 2012 to 2016 and Minister of Agriculture and Rural Development from 2015 to 2016. In 2017, he was elected to the People's National Assembly as a member of the National Liberation Front, where he supported the fifth term of President Abdelaziz Bouteflika. He resigned from his mandate on 4 March 2019 amidst the Hirak Movement.

From 2020 to 2021, Ferroukhi was interim .

Sid Ahmed Ferroukhi died of cardiac arrest in Rouïba on 17 June 2022 at the age of 54.

References

1967 births
2022 deaths
21st-century Algerian politicians
Members of the People's National Assembly
People from Bologhine
National Liberation Front (Algeria) politicians
Government ministers of Algeria